Terra Incognita is the fourth full-length studio album by German gothic metal band Coronatus, released on 18 November 2011 by Massacre Records.

Track listing

Personnel
 Carmen R. Schäfer – vocals
 Gaby Koss – soprano vocals
 Ada Flechtner – vocals
 Mareike Makosch – vocals
 Petra Straussova – vocals
 Ally "The Fiddle" Storch – fiddle
 Dirk Baur – conductor, bass guitar, backing vocals
 Aria Keramati Noori – guitar
 Simon Maria Hassemer – keyboard
 Teddy Moehrke – tenor vocals
 Albrecht Lutz – tenor vocals, bass vocals
 Mats Kurth – drums

References

2011 albums
Coronatus albums
Massacre Records albums